Superliga de Voleibol Masculina 2012–13 is the 49th (XLIX) season since its establishment. The 2012–13 regular season started on October 13, 2012, and finished on March 2, 2013.

Championship playoffs began March 8, with the two semifinals winners vying for the championship title in the Final.

Defending champion CAI Teruel was defeated in the Final by Unicaja Almería, thus winning its ninth title, its first title since the last time in 2004-05 season.

Competition format 
10 teams played in a two-rounds format. Upon completion of regular season, the top four teams play Championship's playoffs, while the bottom team is relegated to Superliga 2.

During regular season, a win by 3–0 or 3–1 means 3 points to winner team, while a 3–2 win, 2 points for winner team & 1 for loser team.

Championship playoffs is played to best of 3 games.

2012–13 season teams

2012–13 regular season standings

Championship playoffs

Bracket
To best of three games.

Semifinals

Match 1

|}

Match 2

|}

Match 3

|}

Final

Match 1

|}

Match 2

|}

Match 3

|}

Match 4

|}

Final MVP: Andrés Villena

Top scorers
(This statistics includes regular season and playoff matches.)

External links
Superliga Masculina regular season standings
Superliga Masculina playoffs schedule

2012 in volleyball
2013 in volleyball
Superliga de Voleibol Masculina
2013 in Spanish sport
2012 in Spanish sport